The following is a list of integrals (antiderivative functions) of trigonometric functions. For antiderivatives involving both exponential and trigonometric functions, see List of integrals of exponential functions. For a complete list of antiderivative functions, see Lists of integrals. For the special antiderivatives involving trigonometric functions, see Trigonometric integral.

 

In all formulas the constant a is assumed to be nonzero, and C denotes the constant of integration.

Integrands involving only sine

Integrands involving only cosine

Integrands involving only tangent

Integrands involving only secant 
 See Integral of the secant function.

Integrands involving only cosecant

Integrands involving only cotangent

Integrands involving both sine and cosine 

An integral that is a rational function of the sine and cosine can be evaluated using Bioche's rules.

Integrands involving both sine and tangent

Integrand involving both cosine and tangent

Integrand involving both sine and cotangent

Integrand involving both cosine and cotangent

Integrand involving both secant and tangent

Integrand involving both cosecant and cotangent

Integrals in a quarter period

Integrals with symmetric limits

Integral over a full circle

See also
Trigonometric integral

Trigonometric functions
Trigonometry